Tahoe National Forest is a United States National Forest located in California, northwest of Lake Tahoe. It includes the  peak of Sierra Buttes, near Sierra City, which has views of Mount Lassen and Mount Shasta. It is located in parts of six counties: Sierra, Placer, Nevada, Yuba, Plumas and El Dorado. Its headquarters is in Nevada City, California. There are local ranger district offices in Camptonville, Foresthill, Sierraville and Truckee.

Tahoe National Forest has many natural and man-made resources for the enjoyment of its visitors, including hundreds of lakes and reservoirs (most notably Boca Reservoir), river canyons carving through granite bedrock, and many miles of trails including a portion of the Pacific Crest Trail. The National Wilderness Preservation System's Granite Chief Wilderness is close by to Tahoe City, where many trails branch out into the Wilderness.

The forest also serves as the water supply headwaters for the towns of Lincoln, Auburn and Rocklin. Reno, Nevada and Sparks, Nevada also receive their water from the Truckee River which runs through both cities on its way to its terminus at Pyramid Lake. It is also home to three wolverines.

Overview 

The Forest Reserves were established in 1893 to halt uncontrolled exploitation of its resources. Tahoe was originally established as the Lake Tahoe Forest Reserve on April 13, 1899. The name was changed to Tahoe on October 3, 1905.

President Theodore Roosevelt supported the transfer of forest reserves from the U.S. Department of the Interior
to the Department of Agriculture's Forest Service in 1905, with Gifford Pinchot as Chief Forester. Thus began the United States National Forest System. In 1908, the Sierra National Forest was divided into five units and as time went on, more divisions, additions, and combinations were worked out so that presently, Tahoe is one of eight national forests along the Sierra Nevada Mountain Range. They are, from north to south, Plumas, Tahoe, Eldorado, Toiyabe, Stanislaus, Inyo, Sierra, and Sequoia.

The charter given by James Wilson, U.S. Secretary of Agriculture, states: The National Forests are for the purpose of preserving a perpetual supply of timber for home industries, preventing a destruction of forest cover which regulates the flow of streams, and protecting  local residents from unfair competition in the use of forest and range. The timber, water, pasture and mineral resources of the national forests are for the use of the people.

Vegetation

The old growth includes coast Douglas fir (Pseudotsuga menziesii var. menziesii), Ponderosa pine (Pinus ponderosa), white fir (Abies concolor), sugar pine (Pinus lambertiana), California incense cedar (Calocedrus decurrens), California black oak (Quercus kelloggii), lodgepole pine (Pinus contorta) and red fir (Abies magnifica). A number of species of invasive weeds have been recorded in the Forest, including thistles, knapweeds, mustards, toadflaxes, daisies, brooms, and aquatic.

Placer County Big Trees Grove
Placer County Big Trees Grove is a giant sequoia grove located in the American River watershed of Tahoe National Forest. It is known as a "tiny" giant sequoia grove, and is the northernmost grove of giant sequoias. The grove contains six old growth giant sequoias, two of which are considered "giant" size.

See also
 Ecology of the Sierra Nevada
 List of plants of the Sierra Nevada (U.S.)
 :Category:Fauna of the Sierra Nevada (United States)
 Schroeder Mountain

References

External links

 Official Tahoe National Forest website
  Sierra Club online exhibit of John Muir speech to the club in 1895

 
Protected areas of the Sierra Nevada (United States)
National Forests of California
Lake Tahoe
Protected areas of Sierra County, California
Protected areas of Placer County, California
Protected areas of Nevada County, California
Protected areas of Yuba County, California
Protected areas of Plumas County, California
Protected areas of El Dorado County, California
Giant sequoia groves
Protected areas established in 1905
1905 establishments in California